The 1948 United States Senate election in Nebraska took place on November 2, 1948. Senate Majority Whip Kenneth S. Wherry was re-elected to a second term, defeating former Representative Terry Carpenter. He won by a larger margin than 1942, due to the absence of a third party candidate. Wherry overperformed Republican presidential candidate Thomas Dewey by 2.55%, who won the state with 54.15% in the presidential election.

Democratic primary

Candidates
Albin T. Anderson, communications officer with the 7th Fleet of the U.S. Navy 1943-1945
Terry Carpenter, former Representative for Nebraska's 5th district and mayor of Scottsbluff, Nebraska
George W. Olsen, Democratic candidate for Governor of Nebraska in 1944

Results

Republican primary

Candidates
Joseph B. Bovey, member of the Lincoln Board of Education
Kenneth S. Wherry, the incumbent Senator

Results

Results

References 

1948
Nebraska
United States Senate